Oak Ridge, Pennsylvania may refer to the following places in the U.S. state of Pennsylvania:
Oak Ridge, Armstrong County, Pennsylvania
Oak Ridge, Clearfield County, Pennsylvania